Carles Riera i Albert (born 1960) is a Catalan sociologist and politician.

During the 1980s he was a member and spokesman for the Call to Solidarity in Defense of Catalan Language, Culture and Nation, in the 90s he was a member of the secretariat of the People's Unity Assembly and currently is a member of Endavant. In the Catalan elections held on 27 September 2015, he formed part of the Popular Unity Candidacy–Constituent Call coalition which won 10 seats in the 135-member Parliament of Catalonia. He led the Popular Unity Candidacy party in the 2017 Catalan elections, in which won 4 seats.

References

External links
Carles Riera

1960 births
Living people
Members of the 11th Parliament of Catalonia
Members of the 12th Parliament of Catalonia
Polytechnic University of Catalonia alumni
Popular Unity Candidacy politicians